Abraxesis is a monotypic moth genus in the family Geometridae. Its single species, Abraxesis melaleucaria, was described from Shimla, India. Both the genus and species were first described by George Hampson in 1902.

References

Ennominae
Geometridae genera
Monotypic moth genera